The 2019 UniSport Nationals, was a national multi-sport event held from 28 September to 3 October 2019 in Gold Coast, Queensland, Australia.

More than 5,300 student athletes from 43 universities participated at the event. The University of Sydney topped the pennant tally, with the University of Queensland and the University of Technology Sydney finishing second and third, respectively. Bond University was awarded the Doug Ellis Per Capita Trophy, and RMIT University was awarded the John White Spirit Trophy.

Pennant tally

Awards

Overall

North region

South region

East region

West region

See also
Sport in Australia

References

External links
 UniSport Nationals website

UniSport
UniSport Nationals